The canton of L'Entre-Deux-Mers is an administrative division of the Gironde department, southwestern France. It was created at the French canton reorganisation which came into effect in March 2015. Its seat is in Cadillac.

It consists of the following communes:
 
Baigneaux
Béguey
Bellebat
Bellefond
Blésignac
Cadillac
Capian
Cardan
Caudrot
Cessac
Coirac
Courpiac
Donzac
Escoussans
Faleyras
Frontenac
Gabarnac
Gornac
Haux
Ladaux
Langoiran
Laroque
Lestiac-sur-Garonne
Loupiac
Lugasson
Martres
Monprimblanc
Montignac
Mourens
Omet
Paillet
Le Pian-sur-Garonne
Porte-de-Benauge
Rions
Romagne
Saint-André-du-Bois
Sainte-Croix-du-Mont
Sainte-Foy-la-Longue
Saint-Genis-du-Bois
Saint-Germain-de-Grave
Saint-Laurent-du-Bois
Saint-Laurent-du-Plan
Saint-Léon
Saint-Macaire
Saint-Maixant
Saint-Martial
Saint-Martin-de-Sescas
Saint-Pierre-d'Aurillac
Saint-Pierre-de-Bat
La Sauve
Semens
Soulignac
Tabanac
Targon
Le Tourne
Verdelais
Villenave-de-Rions

References

Cantons of Gironde